Vladimir Anatolevich Ovsyannikov (also transliterated as Vladimir Anatolyevich Ovsannikov; born November 22, 1961) is a member of the Russian State Duma. He is a member of the State Duma's Committees on Defense.  He is a member of the LDPR.

External links 
 Official web page at the Russian State Duma 

1961 births
Living people
Fourth convocation members of the State Duma (Russian Federation)
Fifth convocation members of the State Duma (Russian Federation)
Sixth convocation members of the State Duma (Russian Federation)